Strunius is an extinct genus of lobe-finned fish from the Late Devonian period of Germany.

Although it was a lobe-finned fish, Strunius''' fins were supported by fin rays, which are more associated with ray-finned fish. However, its skull was composed of two articulating halves, a feature characteristic of the lobe-finned rhipidistians. The skull was also divided by a deep articulation, with both halves probably connected by a large muscle, increasing the power of the bite. The same system is seen in coelacanths and the better-known Eusthenopteron.

It was covered in large, round, bony scales, and probably fed on other fishes.

References

Onychodontida
Prehistoric lobe-finned fish genera
Late Devonian animals
Late Devonian fish
Devonian bony fish
Devonian fish of Europe